The following lists events that happened during 2004 in Bosnia and Herzegovina.

Incumbents
Presidency:
Sulejman Tihić
Dragan Čović 
Borislav Paravac
Prime Minister: Adnan Terzić

Events

February
 February 26 - The President of the Republic of Macedonia Boris Trajkovski died in an airplane accident in Bosnia and Herzegovina.

References

 
Years of the 21st century in Bosnia and Herzegovina
2000s in Bosnia and Herzegovina
Bosnia and Herzegovina
Bosnia and Herzegovina